The Carson River Diversion Dam on the Carson River near Fallon, Nevada was built in 1904–05.

It diverts water for use in agricultural irrigation in hundreds of farms within the Newlands Projects area.  It is located five miles northeast of the Lahontan Dam on the Carson River.

It was listed on the National Register of Historic Places in 1981.

References 

Dams completed in 1904
National Register of Historic Places in Churchill County, Nevada
Dams on the National Register of Historic Places in Nevada
1904 establishments in Nevada